H16 or H-16 may refer to:

Transport 
 Curtiss H-16, a 1914 American Curtiss Model H flying boat variant
 H16 engine, a type of H engine like the Fairey H-16
 HMS Daring (H16), a 1932 British Royal Navy D Class destroyer
 , a World War I British Royal Navy H class submarine
 LSWR H16 class, a British LSWR locomotive
 Piasecki H-16, a tandem-rotor helicopter

Other uses 
 H16, a type of heath community in the British National Vegetation Classification
 H16, a Slovak rap group named after the former Hálova 16 elementary school, Majk Spirit is one of their members
 H-16 County Highway, an alternative name for Forest Highway 16.
 Keratitis, by ICD-10 code

Ship disambiguation pages